Transgender disenfranchisement is the prevention by bureaucratic, institutional and social barriers, of transgender individuals from voting or participating in other aspects of civic life. Transgender people may be disenfranchised if the sex indicated on their identification documents (which some states require voters to provide) does not match their gender presentation, and they may be unable to update necessary identity documents because some governments require individuals to undergo sex reassignment surgery first, which many cannot afford, are not medical candidates for, or do not want. 

Transgender individuals identifying outside the gender binary of male and female (non-binary) are even more frequently disenfranchised. This may be due to a lack of legal recognition for other genders, high fees, complex legal processes, and requirements for medical transition steps that many non-binary individuals cannot have or do not want especially since many such medical procedures are specifically for binary transgender individuals (such as sex reassignment surgery).

Obtaining and updating documents 
The National Gay and Lesbian Task Force's 2011 National Transgender Discrimination Survey finds that only 21% of people who identify as transgender have been able to update all of their IDs and records to reflect their gender; 33% have not updated any IDs. A 2018 study found that 78,300 transgender people in just eight U.S. states might be disenfranchised because of photo ID laws.

There are bureaucratic as well as social obstacles to updating identification documents. Many policies were enacted at a time when it was assumed that in order for transition from one gender to another to be complete, a person had to undergo sex reassignment surgery. However, modern health experts' current understanding is that transitions are an individualized process that can involve a variety of steps, sometimes involving surgery, but often not.

As of 2019, GLAD is running the "Pop-Up ID Project," which provides free legal representation to transgender residents of the six New England states for the purpose of updating their documents.

Utility bill 
In accordance with the Help America Vote Act, some states allow voters to use two forms of identification that only list name and address, such as a utility bill, which alleviates the issue of having to change one's gender on a document.

Birth certificate 

While birth certificates can be used as voter identification in non-photo identification states, birth certificate laws are established at the state level and commonly require that the individual undergo surgery in order for the gender on the document to be updated. Some states even make it mandatory that transgender people acquire a court order in order to change the gender on their birth certificate, which presents even more financial obstacles.

The first case to deal with legal recognition of transgender identity in the United States was In re Anonymous v. Weiner in 1966. A post-operative male-to-female trans woman applied for a change of sex on her birth certificate through the Bureau of Vital Statistics in the New York City Health Department. The Bureau turned to the Board of Health who then called on a committee on public health of the New York Academy of Medicine to make a recommendation. The application was ultimately denied and the Board of Health stated that "an individual born one sex cannot be changed for the reasons proposed by the request which was made to us. Sex can be changed where there is an error, of course, but not when there is a later attempt to change psychological orientation of the patient and including such surgery as goes with it."

As of March 2018, surgery is a prerequisite for changing one's gender marker on birth certificates issued by 25 states. Those states are: Alabama, Arizona, Arkansas, Colorado, Delaware, Florida, Georgia, Illinois, Kentucky, Louisiana, Maine, Maryland, Massachusetts, Michigan, Missouri, Montana, Nebraska, New Mexico, North Carolina, North Dakota, Rhode Island, Virginia and West Virginia. The remaining states either may change the birth certificate without proof of surgery or will not change the birth certificate at all.

Presenting identity documents 
The Williams Institute on Sexual Orientation and Gender Identity Law and Public Policy estimated that by requiring voters to present a government-issued photo ID at the polls, nine states may have disenfranchised over 25,000 transgender people in the November 2012 presidential election, because poll workers are unlikely to have training on how to handle transgender people, and may erroneously suspect voter fraud.

Transgender individuals may also be discouraged from voting under these circumstances because of prior experiences with presenting identification that does not accurately reflect their gender: 40% percent of transgender people reported being harassed in situations where they presented gender incongruent identification, while 15% reported being asked to leave the venue where the identification had been presented, and 3% reported being assaulted or attacked as a result of presenting their ID. Additionally, 22% percent reported being denied equal treatment or being verbally harassed by government officials.

Felon disenfranchisement and transgender incarceration 

Transgender people lack employment discrimination protection, and face high rates of homelessness and harassment. 16% of transgender people have reported being incarcerated at some point in their lives, compared to 2.7% of the general American population. while 38% reported harassment during police interactions.

See also 
 Disenfranchisement
 Felony disenfranchisement in the United States
 History of violence against LGBT people in the United States
 LGBT people in prison
 Transgender inequality
 Transgender rights in the United States
 Transphobia
 Transphobia in the United States
 Voter ID laws in the United States
 Voter suppression in the United States

References

External links 
 

Discrimination against LGBT people in the United States
History of voting rights in the United States
Transgender rights in the United States
Discrimination against transgender people
Electoral restrictions
Voter suppression